Old Town station is an A-train commuter rail station in Lewisville, Texas. It serves commuters from Lewisville and is a destination station in the city's historic downtown area.

References

External links
My A-train, DCTA

A-train (Denton County Transportation Authority) stations
Railway stations in the United States opened in 2011
Railway stations in Denton County, Texas